Issa Ali Al-Balochi (born 2 April 1981) is an Emirati footballer who played at the 2007 AFC Asian Cup.

References

1981 births
Living people
Emirati footballers
United Arab Emirates international footballers
Association football midfielders
UAE Pro League players
Al-Wasl F.C. players
Al-Nasr SC (Dubai) players
Al-Shaab CSC players
Al-Ittihad Kalba SC players
Emirati people of Baloch descent
2007 AFC Asian Cup players